Roberto "Bobby" Marcano Cherubini (June 7, 1951 – November 13, 1990) was a Venezuelan professional baseball player who made a name for himself playing in Nippon Professional Baseball (NPB) and for Tiburones de La Guaira in the Venezuelan Winter League.

During the MLB off-seasons he also played for Tiburones de La Guaira  steadily from 1969–1985.

In , Marcano went to Japan, where he joined the Hankyu Braves as a second baseman. (The team has since become the Orix BlueWave, and then the Orix Buffaloes.) With Marcano putting up big numbers, the Braves went to four straight Japan Series, winning the first three (the first championships in the franchise's history). Marcano played for Hankyu for eight years, then joined the Yakult Swallows for another three. Over the course of his NPB career, Marcano was awarded four Gold Gloves, and was named to the Best Nine four times. He is noted by many sources as being one of the best foreign-born players in Japanese baseball.

Marcano played outfield for Tiburones de La Guaira (representing Venezuela) in the 1983 Caribbean Series.

After retiring from the game, Marcano worked for the Yomiuri Giants as a scout and translator.

Marcano died at age 39, shortly after being diagnosed with cancer. His number 15 jersey was retired by Tiburones de La Guaira.

References

External links
 Career statistics and player information from  Baseball Reference (Minors)
 Venezuelan Professional Baseball League statistics 
 The Baseball Guru

1951 births
1990 deaths
Deaths from cancer
Elmira Pioneers players
Hankyu Braves players
Jacksonville Suns players
Llaneros de Portuguesa players
People from Caracas
Portland Beavers players
Salt Lake City Angels players
Savannah Indians players
Sioux Falls Packers players
Tampa Tarpons (1957–1987) players
Tiburones de La Guaira players
Venezuelan baseball players
Venezuelan people of Italian descent
Venezuelan expatriate baseball players in Japan
Yakult Swallows players